Montazeau is a commune in the Dordogne department in Nouvelle-Aquitaine in southwestern France.

It is fairly close to Bergerac and Bordeaux. Many of its inhabitants derive their principal income from winemaking.

Population

Events
Montazeau is known for its annual cheese-wine festival in which the townspeople make cheese-wine (a local delicacy) and it is then judged by the mayor.

See also
Communes of the Dordogne department

References

External links

 Town council website

Communes of Dordogne